Matouš Trmal (born 2 October 1998) is a Czech professional footballer who plays as a goalkeeper for Primeira Liga club Marítimo, on loan from Vitória Guimarães.

Professional career
Trmal joined the youth academy of Slovácko in 2014 at the age of 16. Trmal made his professional debut with Slovácko in a 2–1 Czech First League loss to FC Viktoria Plzeň on 28 October 2018. On 31 July 2020, Trmal signed a contract with Vitória Guimarães .

External links

Idnes Profile
Fotbal.CZ Profile

References

1998 births
Living people
People from Znojmo District
Czech footballers
Czech Republic youth international footballers
Association football goalkeepers
Vitória S.C. players
1. FC Slovácko players
Primeira Liga players
Czech First League players
Czech expatriate footballers
Czech expatriate sportspeople in Portugal
Expatriate footballers in Portugal
Sportspeople from the South Moravian Region
C.S. Marítimo players